HMCS Beacon Hill was a  that served in the Royal Canadian Navy (RCN) as an ocean convoy escort during the Second World War. She fought primarily in the Battle of the Atlantic. She was named for Victoria, British Columbia, but because  was in service with the Royal Navy, the RCN, in an effort to avoid confusion, chose to honour the city by choosing another name associated with it.

Beacon Hill was ordered in October 1941 as part of the 1942-43 River-class building programme. She was laid down 16 July 1943 by Yarrows Ltd. at Esquimalt, British Columbia and launched 6 November later that year. Beacon Hill was commissioned 16 May 1944 at Esquimalt.

Background

The River-class frigate was designed by William Reed of Smith's Dock Company of South Bank-on-Tees. The first orders were placed by the Royal Navy in 1940 and the vessels were named for rivers in the United Kingdom, giving name to the class. In Canada they were named after towns and cities though they kept the same designation. The name "frigate" was suggested by Vice-Admiral Percy Nelles of the Royal Canadian Navy and was adopted later that year.

Improvements over the corvette design included improved accommodation which was markedly better. For underwater targets, the River-class frigate was equipped with a Hedgehog anti-submarine mortar and depth charge rails aft and four side-mounted throwers.

River-class frigates were the first Royal Canadian Navy warships to carry the 147B Sword horizontal fan echo sonar transmitter in addition to the irregular ASDIC. This allowed the ship to maintain contact with targets even while firing unless a target was struck. Improved radar and direction-finding equipment improved the RCN's ability to find and track enemy submarines over the previous classes.

Canada originally ordered the construction of 33 frigates in October 1941. The design was too big for the shipyards on the Great Lakes so all the frigates built in Canada were built in dockyards along the west coast or along the St. Lawrence River. In all Canada ordered the construction of 60 frigates including ten for the Royal Navy that transferred two to the United States Navy.

Service history
After working up in Bermuda, Beacon Hill was assigned to Mid-Ocean Escort Force (MOEF) EG 26, a Canadian support group that would assist any convoy under attack. During her time with EG 26, she was sporadically detached to Plymouth and Portsmouth commands. EG 26 is among the escort groups deployed to counter snorkel-equipped U-boats in British coastal waters beginning in mid-December 1944. Deploying from Derry, the groups operated in overlapping patrols in the Shetland-Faroes narrows, off Hebrides, in the Irish Sea west of Ireland and in St. George's Channel. In March 1945, EG 26 deployed from Portsmouth. From at least 14 March to 20 April, Beacon Hill was the Senior Officer's ship of the group. She remained in European waters until May 1945, when she departed for Canada. Intended to be used in the ongoing Pacific campaign, Beacon Hill began her tropicalization refit at Liverpool, Nova Scotia in June. The refit ended in November 1945, and she sailed for Esquimalt. Beacon Hill was paid off at Esquimalt on 6 February 1946 and placed in reserve.

Post-war service
Beacon Hill was recommissioned in March 1950 as a training ship for cadets. In January 1952, Beacon Hill and  deployed on a training cruise to South America along the Pacific coast, making several port visits. In May, Antigonish and Beacon Hill travelled to Juneau, Alaska and in August, to San Diego on training cruises. She was paid off again in 1954 in preparation for her conversion to a Prestonian-class frigate. Beacon Hill was recommissioned into the RCN with the pennant number FFE 303 on 21 December 1957. During service with the Fourth Canadian Escort Squadron she was fitted with a midship deckhouse to provide classroom and training facilities for officer candidates. Beacon Hill was a member of the Fourth Canadian Escort Squadron based out of Esquimalt, British Columbia. In June 1960 the Fourth Canadian Escort Squadron performed a training tour of the Pacific, with stops at Yokohama, Japan, Midway Atoll and Pearl Harbor. They returned to Canada in August. From January to March 1961,  and Beacon Hill performed a training cruise to the South Pacific, visiting Hawaii, Fiji, New Zealand, Australia and Samoa. In the summer of 1966, she and Jonquiere undertook a 6 week training cruise with officer cadets and sea cadets with port visits in San Francisco, San Diego and Ketchikan.

She served until 15 September 1967 when she was paid off for the final time. She was sold for scrap and broken up at Sakai, Japan in 1968.

Ship's bell
The Christening Bells Project at Canadian Forces Base Esquimalt Naval and Military Museum includes information from the ship's bell of HMCS Beacon Hill 1944–1967, which was used for baptism of babies on board ship 1950–1964. The bell is currently held by the CFB Esquimalt Naval & Military Museum, Esquimalt, British Columbia.

References

Notes

Sources
 
 
 

River-class frigates of the Royal Canadian Navy
1943 ships